Roger D. Nelson is an American scientist and researcher and the director of the Global Consciousness Project (GCP), an international, multi-laboratory collaboration founded in 1997 which aimed to study collective consciousness. From 1980 to 2002, he was Coordinator of Research at the Princeton Engineering Anomalies Research (PEAR) laboratory at Princeton University. His professional focus was the study of consciousness and intention and the role of the mind in the physical world. His work integrates science and spirituality , including research that is directly focused on numinous communal experiences.

Building on years of laboratory experiments studying the effects of human intention on sensitive engineering equipment , Nelson began using random event generator (REG) technology in the field to study effects of special states of group consciousness. This led to the GCP, a globally distributed network of REGs around the world sending data continuously over the Internet to a server in Princeton, NJ. The network is designed to register indications of a hypothesized global consciousness responding to major world events such as 9/11/2001, the beginnings of wars, or New Year's Eve.

Nelson's professional degrees are in experimental cognitive psychology. Until his retirement in 2002, he served as the coordinator of experimental work in the Princeton Engineering Anomalies Research Lab (PEAR), directed by Robert Jahn in the department of Mechanical and Aerospace Engineering, School of Engineering/Applied Science, Princeton University.

References

American consciousness researchers and theorists
Living people
Year of birth missing (living people)
Princeton University faculty